Captain Caution is a 1940 American adventure film directed by Richard Wallace set during the War of 1812. The film stars Victor Mature, Bruce Cabot and Alan Ladd. It was based on the novel of the same name by Kenneth Roberts. Elmer Raguse was nominated for an Academy Award for Sound Recording.

Plot

Cast
 Victor Mature as Daniel 'Dan' Marvin
 Louise Platt as Corunna Dorman
 Leo Carrillo as Lucien Argandeau
 Bruce Cabot as Lehrman Slade
 Robert Barrat as Capt. Dorman
 Vivienne Osborne as Victorine Argandeau
 Miles Mander as Lieut. Strope
 El Brendel as Slushy
 Roscoe Ates as Chips
 Andrew Tombes as Sad Eyes
 Aubrey Mather as Mr. Henry Potter
 Alan Ladd as Newton – Mutinous Sailor
 Leyland Hodgson as British Ship's Brig Officer
 Lloyd Corrigan as Capt. Stannage 
 Pierre Watkin as American Consul 
 Cliff Severn as Travers
 Bud Jamison as Blinks 
 James Dime as a sailor
 Olaf Hytten as Stannage's Aide (uncredited)
 Ethan Laidlaw as Prisoner (uncredited)

Production
Kenneth Roberts' novel was published in 1934 and became a best seller. Film rights were bought by Hal Roach who made the film as part of a five-picture deal he had with United Artists. (The others were The Housekeeper's Daughter, One Million Years BC, Of Mice and Men and a novel by Thorne Smith.) Eugene Sollow was assigned to write the script.

Plans to make the film were pushed back following the entry of Britain into World War II out of fear the film could be seen as anti British. However "sea pictures" were in vogue at the time (e.g. The Sea Hawk, South of Pago Pago) so Roach decided to proceed.

The anti-British tone of the novel was softened and the script rewritten by producer Grover Jones, who said "in the main we won't be giving them much time to think about whether they like the theme of the picture or not. We'll be giving them action and more action. And if we let a little plot to trickle in to let them know why they are getting all that fighting, we do it only because the camera needs a new set up now and again." Filming started April 1940 under the direction of Richard Wallace.

References

External links

 
 
 
 
 Review of film at Variety

1940 films
1940 adventure films
American adventure films
American black-and-white films
Films directed by Richard Wallace
Films based on American novels
Films based on historical novels
Seafaring films
War of 1812 films
1940s English-language films
1940s American films